VRL Logistics Limited (formerly Vijayanand Roadlines Ltd.),  commonly known as the VRL Group, is an Indian conglomerate headquartered in Hubballi, Karnataka, India with operations in around 23 states and 4 union territories in the country. Business operations of VRL Group include road transportation, logistics, publishing etc.

VRL Group is one of the large logistics and transport companies in India (incl.4360 vehicles, comprising 419 tourist buses and 3941 transport goods vehicles). Limca Book of Records, mentioned it as the single largest fleet owner of commercial vehicles in the country's private sector.

VRL's Vijayavani is credited with having the largest newspaper circulation in Karnataka.

History
VRL Group was founded by Vijay Sankeshwar in 1976 at Gadag, Karnataka, India. His family had a publication house, which later became a part of VRL Group.

Headquarters and offices
VRL is headquartered in Hubballi, Karnataka and has 931 branches, 40 hubs and transport yards across the country. The headquarters has effluent treatment plant (capacity:175 thousand liters), rainwater harvesting plant, petrol bunk (allotted by Indian Oil Corporation), and a garage service complex, where VRL’s trucks passes through in the fleet, once in every two weeks.

Services

Cargo and Courier 

A subsidiary of VRL Group, VRL General Cargo started its business service as transportation between Hubballi and Gadag, and later has spread across Bengaluru and Belagavi. It has extended into courier services and express cargo, which are now operative in 23 states, handling over 216 million cargos/year, being one of the large networks in the country. Its courier services are operative for parcels ranging from small to large size.

Travel 

VRL's public tour business is operated by its division Vijayanand Travels. With having more than 80 branches, and operated by 1000+ agents, it is the largest in tour business services in Karnataka and Maharashtra. It owns 1550 buses (incl. 742 Volvo buses of 9400 XL and 9400PX multi-axle models), covering six states, moving across 350 routes in the country.

Aviation logistics 

VRL Logistics Ltd. in 2008, started working in Indian Air Chartering Industry, operating under the Indian Air Operator permit (for passenger charter). In the first phase of its business, it owned a Beechcraft Premier I, an aircraft, manufactured by Hawker Beechcraft Inc, United States, while in 2013 it purchased another. It offers Jet aircraft charters to sectors like corporate, leisure and tourism, special missions, event management, advertisement agencies and for flights (VIP category).

Media 

VRL Group's flagship entity, Vijayavani was started on 1 April 2011, which is now the largest circulated newspaper in Karnataka. VRL Group's subsidiary company VRL Media Ltd., prints Vijayavani and is published in 9 cities of the state.  Vijayavani’s lead editor of its editorial division is Chennegowder and Subhash hoogar. Karnataka's second largest circulated newspaper Vijaya Karnataka, was started by Vijay Sankeshwar (of VRL Group) in October 2000, and was sold to the Times group on 16 June 2006.

In April 2017, VRL Media Ltd. started Digvijaya News 24x7, a Kannada television news channel.

See also
 Courier in India
 Indian Postal Service
 Blue Dart Express, a courier service in India
 DTDC, a courier service in India
 Ekart, a courier service in India

References

External links 
 Official website of VRL Group

Express mail
Logistics companies of India
Indian companies established in 1976
Conglomerate companies established in 1976
1976 establishments in Karnataka
Companies based in Karnataka
Indian brands
Airlines established in 2008
Low-cost carriers
Indian trucking industry
Cargo airlines of India
Telecommunications companies of India
Transport companies established in 1976
VRL Group
Companies listed on the National Stock Exchange of India
Companies listed on the Bombay Stock Exchange